AMLP School Cheruputhur  also known as Aided Mapila Lower Primary School is a private aided lower primary school in Kerala, India. It has its own building. The school has total 8 classrooms. The lowest Class is 1 and the highest class in the school is 4. This school has 9 teachers. The school is currently being renovated by Mr. Mohammed Kamarrudin, a philanthropist from Dubai. He is an alumnus of the school and is fulfilling his childhood dream of making the school the best in the area. There is library facility available in this school.

History
AMLP School Cheruputhur was established in the year 1924.

Location
This school is situated in  cheruputhoor village, malappuram district, kerala

See also
Cheruputhoor

References

Schools in Malappuram district